Nic Bürgin (born 22 December 1971) is a Swiss fencer. He competed in the individual épée event at the 1996 Summer Olympics.

References

External links
 

1971 births
Living people
Swiss male fencers
Olympic fencers of Switzerland
Fencers at the 1996 Summer Olympics